Bradytriton is a monotypic genus of salamanders in the family Plethodontidae. it is represented by the species Bradytriton silus, commonly known as the Finca Chiblac salamander, and has been considered the sister taxon of the genus Oedipina. It is found in north-western Guatemala and in Chiapas, south-eastern Mexico.

Description
Adult males measure  and adult females  in snout–vent length. The body is stocky. The head is relatively broad and essentially continuous with the body. The tail is short and laterally compressed, appearing stout when viewed from the side. The limbs are short and slender with diminutive digits that are, apart from their tips, fused together. Dorsal coloration is reddish brown. The head is mostly black and there are black flecks on the anterior part of the body. The cheeks, sides of the tail, and lower flanks are black with dense white flecks.

Habitat and conservation
Specimens were found under pieces of wood and logs. Development is presumably direct (i.e., no free-living larval stage) and not dependent on water.

The area of the type locality is subject to severe habitat loss caused by the settlement of refugees and expanding agriculture; the species has not been recorded there after 1976, despite later searches. However, another population was reported from Chiapas, Mexico in 2015.

References

Plethodontidae
Amphibians of Guatemala
Amphibians of Mexico
Amphibians described in 1983
Taxa named by David B. Wake
Taxonomy articles created by Polbot
Monotypic amphibian genera